Agahi may refer to:

 Agahi (newspaper), published by the Roman Catholic Archdiocese of Karachi, India
 Agahi Award, Pakistani journalism award
 Iranian Police Criminal Investigation Department (Police Āgāhi)
 Muhammad Riza Agahi (1809–1874),  19th-century Chagatai language writer